Robert Last may refer to:

Robert L. Last, biologist and chemist
Robert Last (drummer) (1923–1986), German musician
Robert Last (trade unionist) (1829–1898), British union leader